Paul Schlack (22 December 1897 – 19 August 1987) was a German chemist. He completed his studies at the Technical University of Stuttgart in 1921 and worked as a research chemist in Copenhagen for a year, before returning to Stuttgart. He received his PhD in 1924. Around this time he developed a keen interest in amide chemistry. He synthesized Nylon 6, widely known by its tradename Perlon, on 29 January 1938 whilst working for IG Farben.

External links

1897 births
1987 deaths
20th-century German chemists
20th-century German inventors
Commanders Crosses of the Order of Merit of the Federal Republic of Germany
Recipients of the Order of Merit of Baden-Württemberg
Polymer scientists and engineers
Members of the German Academy of Sciences at Berlin
People educated at Eberhard-Ludwigs-Gymnasium
Scientists from Stuttgart